Imenje is a village in the Municipality of Brda in the Littoral region of Slovenia.

References

External links

Imenje on Geopedia

Populated places in the Municipality of Brda